The Muriane mine is a large mine located in the northern part of Mozambique in Zambezia Province. Muriane represents one of the largest tantalum reserves in Mozambique having estimated reserves of 7 million tonnes of ore grading 0.016% tantalum.

See also
Mineral industry of Mozambique

References 

Tantalum mines in Mozambique